Mixed Faces is a 1922 American silent comedy film directed by Rowland V. Lee and starring William Russell, Renée Adorée, DeWitt Jennings, Elizabeth Garrison, and Charles K. French. The film was released by Fox Film Corporation on October 22, 1922.

Cast
William Russell as Judge J. Woodworth Granger / Jimmy Gallop
Renée Adorée as Mary Allen Sayre
DeWitt Jennings as Murray McGuire
Elizabeth Garrison as Mrs. Sayre
Charles K. French as Mr. Sayre (as Charles French)
Aileen Manning as Mrs. Molly Crutcher
Harvey Clark as William Haskins (as Harvey Clarke)

Preservation
The film is now considered lost.

See also
List of lost films
1937 Fox vault fire

References

External links

Silent American comedy films
1922 films
American silent feature films
American black-and-white films
Fox Film films
Lost American films
1922 comedy films
1922 lost films
Lost comedy films
1920s American films